Dmitri Aleksandrovich Kostyayev (born 13 December 1989) is a former Russian professional footballer.

Club career
He made his professional debut in the Russian Second Division in 2006 for FC Yunit Samara.

References

External links
 

1989 births
Living people
Russian footballers
Russian Premier League players
Association football midfielders
PFC Krylia Sovetov Samara players